Martha Custis may refer to:

 Martha Washington (1731–1802), married name Martha Custis, widow of Daniel Custis and First First Lady of the United States
 Martha Parke Custis (1756–1773), daughter of above
 Martha Parke Custis Peter  (1777–1854), née Martha Custis, granddaughter of Martha Washington and niece of above